Harry Birchill (born 1 January 2001) is an English cyclist, who currently rides for amateur team Team Inspired and as a stagiaire for UCI Continental team . He has represented England at the Commonwealth Games.

Biography
Birchill won the Under-23 title cross country at the 2021 National Championships in Plymouth. He rides for Team Inspired.

In 2022, he was selected for the 2022 Commonwealth Games in Birmingham, where he competed in the men's mountain biking cross country and finished in 8th place.

Major results

Mountain Bike
2018
 3rd  Summer Youth Olympics (with Sean Flynn)
2019
 1st  Cross-country, National Junior Championships
 3rd  Cross-country, UEC European Junior Championships
2021
 1st  Cross-country, National Under-23 Championships

Road
2022
 8th Rutland–Melton CiCLE Classic

References

2001 births
Living people
British male cyclists
Cyclists at the 2022 Commonwealth Games
Commonwealth Games competitors for England
Cyclists at the 2018 Summer Youth Olympics